Lingulida is an order of brachiopods.

Extinct species 
The following are extinct species and genera belonging to the family Lingulidae.

Lingularia Biernat & Emig, 1993
Lingularia ex gr. tenuissima (Bronn, 1837)
Lingularia similis Biernat & Emig, 1993
Lingularia siberica Biernat & Emig, 1993
Lingularia smirnovae Biernat & Emig, 1993
Lingularia michailovae Smirnova & Ushatinskaya, 2001
Lingularia sp. Hori & Campbell, 2004
Lingularia notialis Holmer & Bergston, 2009
Lingularia salymica Smirnova, 2015 in Smirnova & al. (2015)
? Lingula mytilloides Sowerby, Lingula elliptica Phillips, and Lingula parallela Phillips
? Lingula straeleni Demanet
? Lingula lumsdeni Graham
? Lingula squamiformis Phillips
? Lingula aoraki Campbell, 1987
Credolingula Smirnova & Ushatinskaya, 2001
Credolingula olferievi Smirnova & Ushatinskaya, 2001
Credolingula subtruncata Smirnova & Ushatinskaya, 2001
Dignomia Hall, 1871
Dignomia munsterii (d'Orbigny, 1842)
? Dignomia submarginata (d'Orbigny, 1850)
Dignomia alveata (Hall, 1863)
Dignomia lepta (Clarke, 1912)
? Dignomia lineata (Steinman & Hoek, 1912)
Sinolingularia Peng & Shi, 2008
Sinolingularia huananensis Peng & Shi, 2008
Sinolingularia yini Peng & Shi, 2008
Sinoglottidia Peng & Shi, 2008
Sinoglottidia archboldi Peng & Shi, 2008
Argentiella Archbold, Cisterna & Sterren, 2005
Argentiella stappenbecki Archbold, Cisterna & Sterren, 2005
Semilingula Egorov & Popov, 1990
Semilingula miloradovichi (Ifanova, 1972)
Semilingula taimyrensis (Einor)
? Apsilingula Williams, 1977
? Baroisella Hall & Clark 1892

References

External links

Lingulata
Brachiopod orders
Extant Cambrian first appearances